Sue Keller (born July 7, 1952 in Allentown, Pennsylvania) is an American ragtime pianist and singer, who has released several albums. As a child, she had flute and singing lessons, and also played guitar. She attended DePauw University. She played professionally in various styles before settling on ragtime and old forms of jazz. She founded the publishing firm Ragtime Press and the record label HVR in 1992.

Keller was a contestant on the quiz show Jeopardy! in 1997, winning three games and $28,400. She was the festival music director for the Scott Joplin International Ragtime Foundation from 2003 through 2009 and was awarded the foundation's 2010 Friend of Ragtime Award.

Discography

References

External links 
Ragtime Press website, including hundreds of live MIDI performances by Sue Keller, and more.
Sue Keller music at artistdirect.com
 Wild Women Don't Have the Blues

American jazz pianists
American women jazz singers
American jazz singers
American women composers
American jazz composers
DePauw University alumni
Ragtime pianists
Ragtime composers
1952 births
Living people
Musicians from Allentown, Pennsylvania
Singers from Pennsylvania
20th-century American pianists
Jazz musicians from Pennsylvania
20th-century American women pianists
21st-century American pianists
21st-century American women pianists